Warren Hudson (May 25, 1962 – February 16, 2012) was a player in the Canadian Football League. He was the Grey Cup's Most Valuable Canadian in 1990. He died of brain cancer on February 16, 2012, at age 49.

References

1962 births
2012 deaths
Canadian football running backs
Deaths from brain tumor
Neurological disease deaths in Ontario
Deaths from cancer in Ontario
Sportspeople from Scarborough, Toronto
Canadian football people from Toronto
Players of Canadian football from Ontario
Toronto Argonauts players
Winnipeg Blue Bombers players